Fire Up the Blades is the third studio album by Canadian heavy metal band 3 Inches of Blood. It was released on 26 June 2007 by Roadrunner Records and is the band's final release through the label. It is also the first release by the band to feature lead guitarist Justin Hagberg, rhythm guitarist Shane Clark, bassist Nick Cates and drummer Alexei Rodriguez, the latter of whom was kicked out of the band six months later.

Background and recording
The band confirmed in February 2006 that they had begun to write new material, and by then had about four songs prepared to appear on the forthcoming album.

Fire Up the Blades marks the first major role of Joey Jordison of Slipknot and Murderdolls, as a producer, who revealed that he'd been a fan of the band since their first studio album, Battlecry Under a Wintersun.

Prior to the album's release, the band stressed that Fire Up the Blades would be "darker, tighter and more dangerous" than their Roadrunner Records debut. "This album is heavily influenced by low quality beer, bong rips and listening to black metal in the dark," says Hooper. "It doesn't sound blatantly black metal, it still sounds like us. But it's a faster, more intense
version of us."

A sampler containing demo versions of "The Goatriders Horde" and "Night Marauders" began circulating the Internet in March 2007. This sampler may have been bootlegged however, as a demo version of "Night Marauders" was previously released that January on a free CD issued with that month's edition of Metal Hammer magazine. The demo of "The Goatriders Horde" was also most likely ripped from a stream of the song which was made available on Roadrunner Records' website.

On at least one occasion since the firing of drummer Alexei Rodriguez, the band has performed live with Jordison as drummer.

Lyrical themes
 "Trial of Champions" is about an enslaved gladiator who fights his way to victory, and ultimately kills the emperor. This is a reference to the Fighting Fantasy game book of the same name, which features a similar plot.
 "God of the Cold White Silence" references Ithaqua, a Great Old One in the Cthulhu Mythos of H. P. Lovecraft.
 "Forest King" is about flora and fauna taking revenge on humanity.
 "The Great Hall of Feasting" is about the massive dining halls of Valhalla.
 "The Hydra's Teeth" refers to Jason and the Argonauts on their quest for the Golden Fleece.

Track listing

Personnel
 Cam Pipes – clean vocals
 Jamie Hooper – screaming vocals
 Justin Hagberg – guitars
 Shane Clark – guitars
 Nick Cates – bass
 Alexei Rodriguez – drums
 Joey Jordison – producer
 Dan Turner - Engineer

Release history

References

2007 albums
3 Inches of Blood albums
Roadrunner Records albums